Pierre-Alain Menneron (born 6 April 1975) is a French bobsledder. He competed in the four man event at the 2006 Winter Olympics.

References

1975 births
Living people
French male bobsledders
Olympic bobsledders of France
Bobsledders at the 2006 Winter Olympics
Sportspeople from Lyon